The National Defence Forces (NDF) ( Quwāt ad-Difāʿ al-Watanī) is a pro-government militia, that was formed on 1 November 2012 and organized by the Syrian government during the Syrian Civil War as a part-time volunteer reserve component of the Syrian Armed Forces.

The NDF is made of units across various Syrian provinces, each of them consists of local volunteers willing to fight against rebels for various reasons.

Formation 
By the beginning of 2013, the Syrian government took steps to formalize and professionalize hundreds of Popular Committee militias under a new group dubbed the National Defence Forces.

The goal was to form an effective, locally based, highly motivated force out of pro-government militias. The NDF, in contrast with the Shabiha forces, received salaries and military equipment from the government. Since the formation of the NDF, Shabiha members have been incorporated into its structure. The National Coalition for Syrian Revolutionary and Opposition Forces has defined Shabiha as the Syrian National Defence Forces.

Young and unemployed men join the NDF, which some view as more attractive than the Syrian Army, considered by many of them to be infiltrated by rebels, overstretched and underfunded. A number of recruits say they joined the group because members of their families had been killed by rebel groups. In some Alawite villages almost every military-age male has joined the National Defence Force.

Others, like the Druze people of Al-Suwayda Governorate, join to protect their land from the Islamic State of Iraq and the Levant (ISIL). In late June 2015, the Syrian government began arming citizens of this governorate against ISIL, who were harassing the local population with abductions, executions, and plundering. The locals became a large and powerful NDF contingent in the governorate, including the prominent Golan Regiment.

The creation of the NDF was personally overseen by Iranian Quds Force commander Qasem Suleimani. Syrian security officials stated that they received assistance from Iran and Hezbollah, who both "played a key role in the formalization of the NDF along the model of the Iranian 'Basij' militia". The NDF recruits received training in urban guerilla warfare from Islamic Revolutionary Guard Corps (IRGC) and Hezbollah instructors at facilities inside Syria, Lebanon, and Iran, with this partnership remaining in place as of April 2015. Iran has contributed to gathering together existing neighborhood militias into a functioning hierarchy and provided them with better equipment and training. The United States government has also stated that Iran is helping build the group on the model of its own Basij militia, and that some members are being sent for training in Iran.

Role 
The force acts in an infantry role, directly fighting against rebels on the ground and running counter-insurgency operations in coordination with the Syrian Army, which provides them with logistical and artillery support.

The force was reported to be 60,000-strong as of June 2013 and grew to 100,000 by August. The NDF is composed mainly of members of the Alawite and Shia sects of Islam and are loyal to Syrian Government.

Units mostly operate in their local areas, although members can also choose to take part in army operations. Others have claimed that the NDF does most of the fighting because NDF members, as locals, have a strong knowledge of the region.

Struggling with reliability and issues with defections, officers of the Syrian Army increasingly prefer the part-time volunteer reserves of the NDF, who they regard as more motivated and loyal, over regular army conscripts to conduct infantry operations. An officer in Homs, who asked not to be identified, said the army was increasingly playing a logistical and directive role, while NDF fighters act as combatants on the ground.

The NDF has generally positive interaction with the Syrian Democratic Forces (SDF). On 20 February 2018, NDF battalions volunteered to support the Afrin canton against the Turkish-led operation against Afrin. More recently the NDF has been criticized for escalation and aggressiveness with the SDF in the cities of Qamishli and across the ANES Al-Hasakah, but mediation later ended the skirmishes.

A largely Christian NDF militia from Mhardeh, led by Simon Al-Wakil, has been accused of war crimes, for instance massacres in Halfaya in December 2012 and Kfar Hod in March 2013, and in Al-Lataminah where it has been reported to be responsible for 200 civilian deaths in artillery fire from a monastery it occupied, and of recruiting child soldiers.

Organization and training 
According to a report, as of February 2015 the National Defense Forces are organized under provincial commanders, and loosely overseen by a national coordinator who is reported to be Brigadier-General Ghassan Nassour, although later sources report the name of Hawash Mohammed. Local branches are deemed to act with autonomy and to be not cohesive on the provincial level, although there is little uniformity.

Provincial branches seem to be commanded by a senior officer each.

The period of training can vary from 2 weeks to a month depending on whether an individual is being trained for basic combat, sniping, or intelligence.

According to a 2022 analysis by Carnegie Endowment for International Peace  said "they are not experienced..., poorly equipped and have never excelled on the battlefield."

Lionesses for National Defence 
Since January 2013, the NDF has a 500-strong women's wing called "Lionesses of National Defence", which operates checkpoints in the Homs area. The women are trained to use Kalashnikovs, heavy machine guns and grenades, and taught to storm and control checkpoints.

Funding 
French extreme right non-governmental organization  (SOSCO) has conducted fundraising for the NDF according to an investigation by the Newlines Magazine.

See also 
 Iran–Syria relations
 List of armed groups in the Syrian Civil War

References

External links 
 Documentary: National Defense Press TV documentary on Vimeo
 Documentary: Secret Treaties Press TV documentary on Vimeo

Anti-ISIL factions in Syria
Axis of Resistance
Counterinsurgency organizations
Military units and formations established in 2012
Pro-government factions of the Syrian civil war
Reserve forces